Santiago de Cao is a town in Northern Peru, capital of the district Santiago de Cao of Ascope Province in the region La Libertad. This town is located some 33 km northwest of Trujillo city in the agricultural Chicama Valley.

See also
Paiján culture
Ascope Province
Chavimochic
Virú Valley
Virú
Moche valley

External links
Location of Santiago de Cao by Wikimapia

References

  

 

Populated places in La Libertad Region